Diadelia transversefasciata is a species of beetle in the family Cerambycidae. It was described by Breuning in 1964.

References

Diadelia
Beetles described in 1964